Rivian Automotive, Inc., formerly known as Mainstream Motors and then Avera Automotive, is an American electric vehicle manufacturer and automotive technology company founded in 2009. Rivian is building an electric sport utility vehicle (SUV) and pickup truck on a "skateboard" platform that can support future vehicles or be adopted by other companies. An electric delivery van is also being built as part of a partnership with Amazon. Rivian started deliveries of its R1T pickup truck in late 2021. The company plans to build an exclusive charging network in the United States and Canada by the end of 2023.

Rivian is based in Irvine, California, with its manufacturing plant in Normal, Illinois, and other facilities in Palo Alto, California; Carson, California; Plymouth, Michigan; Vancouver, British Columbia; Wittmann, Arizona; and Woking, England. Additionally, Rivian has plans to build another US$5 billion factory in Georgia.

The company raised over US$13.5 billion in financing following its IPO in November 2021.

History 
The company was founded in 2009 as Mainstream Motors by Robert "RJ" Scaringe. After being renamed as Avera Automotive or Avera Motors, and finally Rivian Automotive in 2011 (a word play on the Indian River in Florida, where Scaringe grew up), the company began focusing on autonomous and electric vehicles.

Rivian's first car model was intended to be a sports car. This vehicle, dubbed the R1, was prototyped as a mid-engine hybrid coupe for the U.S. market, designed by Peter Stevens. However, it was shelved in late 2011 as Rivian looked to restart its business in an effort to have a larger impact on the automotive industry.

Rivian received a large investment and grew significantly in 2015, opening research facilities in Michigan and the Bay Area. Shortly thereafter, Rivian began working exclusively on electric autonomous vehicles, in an attempt to build a network of related products. It also began gearing its prototypes toward the "ride-sharing and driverless car markets."

By September 2016, Rivian was negotiating to buy a manufacturing plant formerly owned by Mitsubishi Motors in Normal, Illinois. In January 2017, Rivian acquired the plant and its manufacturing contents for $16 million, with the plant to become Rivian's primary North American manufacturing facility. Rivian's acquisition of a near production-ready facility instead of building a new factory has been likened to Tesla's acquisition of the NUMMI plant in California.

In December 2017, Rivian revealed its first two products: an electric five-passenger pickup truck and an electric seven-passenger SUV, provisionally named the A1T and A1C, respectively. In November 2018, the truck and SUV were renamed the R1T and R1S, respectively, and unveiled at the LA Auto Show. Both vehicles were described as ready for rough terrain and semi-autonomous, and the company outlined a plan for its next generation of models to be fully autonomous. Production was scheduled to begin in 2020.

Rivian had 250 employees at the start of 2018. By February 2019, however, Rivian was employing 750 people across facilities in Michigan, Illinois, California, and the United Kingdom. In November 2020, Rivian employed 3,000-plus workers. Over the span of another year, employment roughly tripled, and in November 2021, Rivian was listed as having 9,000-plus employees.

In late 2020, Rivian planned to begin shipments of the R1T in June 2021. The June 2021 date later slipped to August. By August, vehicle shipments were delayed again, partly due to the global shortage of chips. In September 2021, Rivian became the first automaker to bring a fully electric pickup to the consumer market, beating industry mainstays such as GM, Ford, and Tesla. In October 2021, Rivian began delivering the R1T truck to customers.

On November 10, 2021, Rivian became a public company through an IPO. 153 million shares were sold at an initial offering price of $78.00, valuing the company at $66.5 billion. The shares began trading on the Nasdaq under the ticker "RIVN." On its first trading day, the stock closed at $100.73 per share, valuing the company at just under $100 billion.

On November 19, 2021, Ford and Rivian announced that the two automakers no longer plan to co-develop an electric vehicle. Ford announced the company would retain a 12 percent stake in Rivian, which reached a value of more than $10 billion after the IPO. Ford sold around 90 percent of its stake in Rivian for $3 billion by the end of 2022, an increase from its $1.2 billion investment.

In December 2021, at the same time that Rivian began to deliver its R1S SUVs, Rivian's chief operations officer, Rod Copes, stepped down and retired from the company as it began to ramp up production of its vehicles.

On March 1, 2022, Rivian announced price increases of 17% for the R1T and 20% for the R1S, citing a shortage of semiconductors and higher costs for other components. There was immediate backlash from customers that had previously made reservations as the price hike would also affect their preorders. Rivian later apologized for the retroactive price increases and stated that the original configured price would be honored for anyone with a Rivian preorder as of the March 1 pricing announcement.

On March 14, 2022, Rivian announced the company hired Frank Klein as its COO (chief operations officer). Klein began on June 1, 2022.

In March 2022, Rivian made it to TIME's List of 100 Most Influential Companies of the year 2022.

On July 27, 2022, Rivian announced it would reduce its workforce by 6% in response to high inflation, rising interest rates, and an increase in parts prices.

In August 2022, regulatory filings revealed that investor George Soros sold roughly 8.5 million of shares of the company while at the same time buying Tesla and Ford.

In September 2022, Rivian signed an MoU with Mercedes-Benz Group to establish a joint venture to invest in and operate a factory in Europe, producing large commercial electric vans starting in a "few years." The facility will have a common assembly line to produce a different design for each company. The New York Times characterized the move as "a rare example of cooperation between a traditional carmaker and a new challenger" and noted that Mercedes' extensive experience in manufacturing may allow Rivian to overcome its own issues with it. Rivian said this planned partnership would not go forward with this plan in December 2022 but stated that future collaborations may still be possible.

In October 2022, Rivian issued a recall of 13,000 vehicles after a manufacturing error was found.

In January 2023, The Wall Street Journal reported the company experienced the departure of multiple top executives in recent months, including some that were among its longest-tenured employees, in what was referred to as a "challenging period for Rivian."

Vehicles 
Designed to be capable off-road, both R1 models have  of ground clearance. The truck has a motor near each of the four wheels, and like some competitors, each wheel can be controlled interdependently. Rivian has said it is designing the vehicles to facilitate "carsharing" with their autonomous features. In addition, Rivian announced the intention to make an electric delivery van (EDV) in three different sizes, capable of carrying  of packages. All three EDVs would share their basic electrical and network architecture, ECUs and battery packs with the Rivian R1 models.

As of December 2021, Rivian reported that it has over 71,000 pre-orders for its R1 models. They produced a total of 24,337 cars in 2022. A recall of 13,000 vehicles was issued in October 2022 due to a potential loose fastener.

R1T 

The R1T features four electric motors, two located on each axle (front and rear). The result is a Rivian-claimed  time of 3.0 seconds.

The Rivian R1T is offered with three battery sizes: 105 kWh, 135 kWh, or 180 kWh. Extra batteries can be mounted in the R1T's bed for improved range. Those backup/auxiliary batteries can be charged by another R1T, if no charging infrastructure is available.

In December 2021, the R1T was named the Motor Trend Truck of the Year.

In August 2022, the company announced it would eliminate the base model of the R1T, called the Explore package, due to low customer demand, and would emphasize the Adventure model. The company said this would help it "streamline" its supply chain issues and deliver as many vehicles as possible.

R1S 

The R1S is a sport utility vehicle version of the first Rivian platform. Because of a shared electric chassis, the R1S design aimed, to have 91 percent shared components with the R1T. The chassis includes braking, suspension and cooling systems with a battery in the center. Rivian's skateboard platform is a relatively flat, low center of gravity chassis typical of electric vehicles, which enables straightforward modification for different body types.

Electric Delivery Van (EDV) 

Rivian entered into a commercial agreement with its investor Amazon, Inc. in February 2019. By September 2019, Amazon's Logistics division had agreed to collaborate with Rivian to design, produce, and purchase 100,000 electric delivery vehicles (EDVs). Initial plans suggested a first delivery date in 2021. , Amazon expected to have as many as 10,000 electric vans in operation by 2022, but was not planning to take delivery of the entire 100,000 Rivian vans the contract calls for until 2030. In November 2022, Rivian announced that it had delivered 1,000 EDVs to Amazon. The Rivian collaboration is part of Amazon's plan to convert its delivery fleet to 100% renewable energy by 2030.

All of the vans will be built on the same platform, which shares the same electrical and network architecture, ECUs, and battery-pack design with the Rivian R1T/R1S models; most will use a basic single-motor e-axle drive unit driving the front wheels. The van is to be produced exclusively for Amazon, and will be built with a steel chassis on a "low-feature-content" assembly line to keep costs down. The van is explicitly designed to allow Amazon to reduce costs and shrink its carbon footprint.

A  prototype for the Amazon electric delivery van was tested on public roads in early 2021. Testing began in Los Angeles and San Francisco. By April 2021, testing was being conducted in Denver with plans to test in 16 U.S. cities in different climate zones. Tests in Oklahoma and Michigan were underway by July 2021.
Amazon contracted Rivian to eventually deliver 100,000 electric delivery vans. Amazon also will source electric vans and three-wheelers from other OEMs, such as Stellantis, Mercedes-Benz Group, and Mahindra. Deployment of the electric delivery vans began in nine U.S. cities in July 2022.

Under terms of a 2019 agreement, Rivian was required to sell all of the vans it makes to Amazon. In early 2023, it was reported that Amazon had notified Rivian that it wanted to buy about 10,000 vans during the year. As this was at the low end of a range previously provided to the auto maker, in response Rivian sought to remove the exclusivity terms of the agreement. If Amazon agrees to end the exclusivity arrangement, Rivian would be free to seek new commercial customers for the vans.

EV charging 

In March 2021, Rivian announced ambitious plans to develop a network of public charging stations across the United States and Canada by the end of 2023. Similar to competitor Tesla, it plans to offer a combination of fast chargers and slower destination chargers and also sell home chargers. The target for the charging network is set for 600 Rivian-exclusive Adventure Network sites made up of 3,500 DC fast chargers at high-traffic locations; 200 kW will be the initial charging speed, with an eventual target of 300 kW.

The company is also planning 10,000 destination chargers (Level 2, 11.5 kW)—called "Rivian Waypoints"—at retail, lodging and dining businesses, as well as parks and other locations; Waypoint chargers are designed to be usable by all electric vehicles with a J1772 connector. Starting July 2021, Rivian planned to install two Rivian Waypoint chargers at up to 50 Colorado State Parks and state recreation areas. However, by October, none had yet been installed as the contract was still making its way through state government bureaucracy with first installations expected in early 2022. In September 2021, the first Waypoint 11.5 kW chargers were installed near Moab, Utah.

In July 2021, Rivian and the state of Tennessee announced plans to install Waypoint chargers at all 56 Tennessee state parks, saying that "Rivian will begin site surveys and engineering over the summer, with installation beginning as early as fall 2021". The first site, Radnor Lake State Park, was unveiled on October 1, 2021.

Facilities 

Rivian is headquartered in Irvine, California, with its location focusing on vehicle engineering and design, propulsion and battery system development, and commercial functions. Rivian's sole production factory in Normal, Illinois, manufactures vehicle components, such as battery packs. The 2.6-million-square-foot (240,000 m2) plant has a paint shop, robotics, stamping machines, and other production equipment, such as injection molding. Rivian's facility in Plymouth, Michigan, focuses on vehicle engineering, prototyping, supply chain, and accounting. Rivian's facility in Palo Alto, California, focuses on software development and engineering, including self-driving features. The company has additional office locations in Carson, California, and Woking, England, working on electric power conversion and advanced engineering, respectively.

Rivian's Normal factory has steadily grown over the years. In July 2020, Rivian's plans for additions totaling 576,000 sq ft to its production facility were approved by the town council.

In December 2021, Rivian announced plans to build a $5 billion battery and assembly plant east of Atlanta. Construction is planned to begin in summer 2022 with car production beginning in 2024 with plans to manufacture up to 400,000 vehicles a year. The plant is currently projected to employ 7,500 workers with possible growth to 10,000 workers. Some locals are opposed to the Rivian plant with reasons such as environmental concerns and government costs, including Georgia proposing to allocate $125 million for costs associated with the factory.

Finances 
As of December 2021, Rivian is a public company trading under the symbol RIVN on the Nasdaq stock exchange.

Funding 
From initial seed stage capital invested by CEO Scaringe in 2009 to its final $2.5 billion round in 2021, Rivian secured 10 rounds of private funding to support the completion of development of line of its vehicles and build out to support production. On November 10, 2021, the company completed its initial public offering, raising $13.5 billion.

Private capital funding 

2011 – The company filed a Form D, reporting debts and warrants totaling $250,000.

2012 – The company filed a second Form D, reporting debts and warrants totaling $1 million Jeddah-based investment firm Abdul Latif Jameel claims to have been the company's earliest investor.

2013–2016 – There were no filings or announcements of funding for Rivian. Cumulative funding remained at $1.25 million.

2017 – In January 2017, at the time the company acquired the former Mitsubishi plant in Normal, Illinois, Rivian received a $1 million grant and a five-year tax abatement from Normal, contingent on meeting certain employment targets and investing $40.5 million over five years. Rivian also received $49.5 million in tax credits from the Illinois state government; these credits are also contingent upon meeting employment targets and investing at least $175 million into the site by 2024.

Sumitomo Corporation made a "large strategic investment" in Rivian in December 2017. The amount was not disclosed.

2018 – Announced on May 23, 2018, Rivian closed on $200 million in debt financing from Standard Chartered Bank, bringing total raised funds to upwards of $450 million. Other backers at the time included existing investors Abdul Latif Jameel and Sumitomo Corporation.

2019–2020 – Announced on February 15, 2019, Amazon led an investment round of $700 million into Rivian. The round included participation from existing shareholders.

Announced on April 24, 2019, Ford Motor Company invested $500 million at a pre-money valuation of $4.5 billion.

Announced on September 10, 2019, Cox Automotive invested $350 million into Rivian, bringing the total raised in 2019 to $1.5 billion. Rivian remained independent, but Cox Automotive planned to add a representative to Rivian's board as part of the investment.

On November 19, 2021, Ford and Rivian announced that they no longer plan to co-develop an electric vehicle. Originally, both companies had planned the joint development of a vehicle for Ford's luxury Lincoln brand. Those plans were canceled in 2020. Ford continued to hold a stake in Rivian, valued at over $10 billion as of November 2021.

In December 2019, Rivian announced it raised billion in a round led by investment manager T Rowe Price with existing investors Ford and Amazon, alongside new investors London/New York firm Pario Ventures and BlackRock-managed funds.

2021 – Announced on January 19, 2021, Rivian raised $2.65 billion led by existing investor T. Rowe Price alongside Soros Fund Management, Fidelity Management & Research, Coatue Management, BlackRock-managed funds, Abdul Latif Jameel, and Amazon, now through its Climate Pledge Fund, plus new investors D1 Capital Partners. Abdul Latif J holds almost 114 million shares in Rivian acquired through $303 million of loans made to the company. Bloomberg estimated the company's value at nearly $28 billion.

Announced on July 23, 2021, Rivian raised $2.5 billion in a round led by Amazon's Climate Pledge Fund, D1 Capital Partners, and Ford Motor Company, alongside existing investors T. Rowe Price, Coatue Management, Fidelity Management & Research. New investors Third Point Ventures and Dragoneer Investment Group joined the round.

Public company 
In August 2021, Rivian filed for an initial public offering, seeking a valuation as high as $80 billion. By then, the firm had raised a total of approximately $11 billion.

In November 2021, Rivian completed its IPO with net proceeds to the firm of $13.5 billion. While initial price targets were in the $58 to $62 range, the actual offering price was $78.00 per share. On its first trading day on November 10, the stock closed at $100.73 per share with a market value of just under $100 billion. At that value, it was worth more than General Motors or Ford and was behind only Tesla in terms of the market cap of automakers. CEO R.J. Scaringe's ownership of 17.6 million shares was worth approximately $2 billion.

Amazon purchased $200 million of stock in the IPO, raising its total stake in Rivian to 22%. Previously, in October 2021, Amazon stated that it owned a 20% stake in the company.

The stock peaked at a closing price of $146.07 on November 13, 2021. From there, the stock price fell more or less continuously during the tech sell-off of winter/spring 2022 to reach $30.68 on April 26, 2022. The market value at the end of April 2022 had declined to roughly $29 billion, a loss of 79 percent. At the beginning of May 2022 the stock price fell further, closing at an all-time low of $22.78 on May 9, 2022, the decline from the peak in November 2021 being nearly 85 percent.

Collaborations 
On December 20, 2018, professional rock climber Alex Honnold announced his partnership with Rivian as a brand partner and collaborator. During a live stream on June 15, 2019, Rivian announced plans to collaborate with the Honnold Foundation and nonprofit Casa Pueblo on a solar project aiming to establish a microgrid in Adjuntas, Puerto Rico, a city that was severely affected by Hurricane Maria in 2017. Rivian planned to repurpose used battery packs from its development vehicles into stationary energy storage units. The microgrid is intended to grant residents access to electricity for core business and will be used daily to mitigate the high cost of energy in Puerto Rico, which is twice the U.S. national average. The project was expected to launch in 2020.

In 2019, Rivian partnered with actors Ewan McGregor and Charley Boorman to provide the first ever production pickups (VIN 000001 and 000002) for use as logistics vehicles and camera cars for the British TV series Long Way Up. They also set up 240 level 2 and level 3 charging stations at 140 locations, along the route from Tierra del Fuego to Los Angeles.

Rivian partners with Yakima for their roof racks (bike, kayak, surfboard etc) and rooftop tents, and MAXTRAX for their recovery boards.

Lawsuits and controversies 
In July 2020, Tesla sued Rivian for allegedly stealing proprietary information, as well as for poaching employees.

In March 2021, the Illinois Automobile Dealers Association filed a lawsuit against Rivian and fellow EV manufacturer Lucid Motors for their plans to sell electric vehicles directly to consumers.

In November 2021, Rivian's former sales and marketing vice president Laura Schwab filed a suit against the company, claiming she was fired a month after raising concerns of discrimination and Rivian being a "boys' club" to the company's HR department. Schwab also claimed that she warned company executives of their vehicles being underpriced and the manufacturing process not conforming to security standards. According to the lawsuit, issues she raised were ignored until male colleagues also raised them subsequently.

See also 
 Fisker Ocean SUV and Alaska pickup
 Ford F-150 Lightning pickup
 GMC Hummer SUV
 Lordstown Endurance pickup (formerly Workhorse W-15)
 Nissan Rich 6 pickup
 Tesla Cybertruck
 VIA Motors

References

External links 

 
  by Fully Charged

Battery electric vehicle manufacturers
Car manufacturers of the United States
American companies established in 2009
Vehicle manufacturing companies established in 2009
2009 establishments in Michigan
Motor vehicle manufacturers based in California
Electric vehicle manufacturers of the United States
Car brands
Companies based in Irvine, California
Truck manufacturers of the United States
Electric trucks
2021 initial public offerings
Manufacturing companies based in Greater Los Angeles